KBMX (107.7 FM, MIX 108) is a top 40 radio station serving Duluth, Minnesota, and Superior, Wisconsin. It is owned by Townsquare Media.

The studios and offices are with its three other sister stations at 14 E. Central Entrance, on the west side of Duluth.

History
The station started out with a country format simulcasting WUSZ 99.9 then became "Z-Rock" (classic rock) before switching to adult contemporary as "The Point". After becoming a Hot AC station as Mix 108 on April 1, 2002, the station gradually evolved to a format which is Top 40 (CHR) that it airs to this day. The station had aired Open House Party on weekends. Surviving competition from full-fledged Top 40/CHR station WWAX "92.1 The Beat" (now "Sasquatch 92.1") briefly, and later falling between the pop music spectrum of full-fledged Top 40/CHR KDWZ (now KDKE "102.5 Duke FM") and full-fledged Hot AC WWAX (as "Nu 92") Mix 108 serves as the Top 40/CHR station for Duluth-Superior area competing against AM 970 WDUL "Hot 98.1".

References

External links
 
 

Radio stations in Duluth, Minnesota
Contemporary hit radio stations in the United States
Radio stations established in 1994
Townsquare Media radio stations
1994 establishments in Minnesota